Robert Hamilton Hyatt (November 1, 1884 – September 11, 1963) was an American professional baseball first baseman. He played in Major League Baseball (MLB) from 1909 to 1918 for the Pittsburgh Pirates, St. Louis Cardinals, and New York Yankees.

Hyatt started his professional baseball career with the Vancouver Beavers of the Northwestern League. In 1908, he hit .323 with 15 home runs; he led the league in hits, home runs, and runs scored. He was purchased by the Pittsburgh Pirates after the season.

Hyatt also had one-year stints playing for the St. Louis Cardinals and the New York Yankees. After his time in the major leagues ended, Hyatt played in the minors. He spent – with the Pacific Coast League's Vernon Tigers, hitting over .300 each year.

References

External links

1884 births
1963 deaths
Major League Baseball first basemen
Baseball players from North Carolina
Pittsburgh Pirates players
St. Louis Cardinals players
New York Yankees players
Vancouver Beavers players
Kansas City Blues (baseball) players
Chattanooga Lookouts players
Toledo Mud Hens players
Vernon Tigers players
People from Buncombe County, North Carolina
American expatriate baseball players in Canada